Stina Elisabet Oscarson (born 17 October 1975) is a Swedish theater director, author, and debater.

Biography
Oscarson grew up in Skellefteå and has worked with theater at Stockholm's stadsteater, along with Suzanne Osten and Etienne Glaser. She has also worked at Byteatern in Kalmar, Västerbottensteatern, and Den Konglige Teater in Copenhagen. In 1997, she started the theater group Teater ML02 which has received attention with productions like Insekternas liv and Elvira Madigan. Between July 2004 and April 2011, she along with Lars Rudolfsson was theater leaders for the Orionteatern in Stockholm.

From May 2011 to May 2014, she was the CEO of Radioteatern at Sveriges Radio. She left the job in May 2014 after being critical of her working environment and experienced a lack of support from Sveriges Radio with her ambition to work to improve and innovate the radio theater section.

Oscarson is a known social debater, amongst others in the culture debate with visions to do theater as a forum for political and democratic talks. In 2010, she released the book Att vara eller vara en vara – visioner om en annan kulturpolitik. Ahead of the 2014 Swedish general elections she wrote the book Handbok för en ny kulturminister at the request of the social service Katalys.

In 2014, Oscarson worked as a leader of the ABF artist work called Socialistikt forum, with the goal to re-instate culture more in the workers everyday life. Since 2014, she writes a chronicle for Dagens Nyheters culture pages. She also has a podcast along with Lars Anders Johansson called "mellan Scylla och Charybdis".

In 2018, Oscarson released Tror du att du kan förändra världen utan att anstränga dig?, a book that wants to discover ways to change the world without violence.

References

Living people
1975 births
Swedish non-fiction writers
Swedish women non-fiction writers
Swedish theatre directors